Yoav Eshed  (born April 28, 1989) is a jazz guitarist and composer born in Israel, based in Brooklyn, NY. 
Yoav started to play the piano at the age of 3 and displayed prodigious abilities playing Haydn, Bach and Mendelssohn. He picked up the guitar at the age of 13 and found his unique way to play the guitar with a pianist approach.

Biography

Early life 
Born in Ramat Hasharon to a family of musicians including his great uncle who perished in the Holocaust and was a gifted musician and cantor. He began studying piano at the young age of 3 and picked up the guitar at the age of 13. Studied jazz with Amit Golan and guitar with Shai Chen. After he finished his four years army service, Yoav attended Rimon School of Jazz and Contemporary Music and won 1st place in Israel's annual jazz competition. He then received the presidential scholarship for his undergraduate studies at Berklee. In addition, Yoav won the America-Israel Cultural Foundation jazz study scholarships between 2008–2014.

Career in Israel 
In 2012 Trio Millionaires led by Yoav Eshed received the support of the Ministry of Culture for an arranging project of a well-known Israeli children's songbook The 16th Sheep jazz, collaborating with singer and comedian Tomer Sharon. The trio recorded their debut album and released it digitally on Bandcamp

Career in United States 
Nowadays Yoav is based in New York City and active in Europe and in the jazz scene of New York, playing for various bands and leading his band - Guitar Hearts

Awards and honors 
 1st place prize at the international competition in Montana – 'Six String Theory' jazz category
 1st place prize at Rimon Jazz Annual Competition 
 International Jazz Guitar Competition in Montreux Jazz Festival - the following year he was invited to play at the festival
 Guitar Achievement Award of Berklee
 1st place of Best Solo Performance of Made In NY Jazz Competition

Discography 
As a Band Leader:
 Introducing Trio Millionaires (2013)
 Two Words (2018)
 August (2020)
 A Way Out (2021)
As Sideman:
 Clemens Grassman - Midnight Apple (2018)
 Fima Chupakin - Water (2019)
 Aaron Bahr Septet - Places (Real and Imagined) (2020)
 Steven Terry - Compositions (2020)
 Ari Hoenig - Golden Treasures (2022)

External links 
 
 

1989 births
Living people
Avant-garde jazz musicians
Berklee College of Music alumni